The Tilatá Formation (N1t, Tpt) is a geological formation of the Bogotá savanna, Altiplano Cundiboyacense, Eastern Ranges of the Colombian Andes. The formation consists of coarse to very coarse conglomerates and sandstones. The formation underlies the Quaternary sequence of alluvial, lacustrine and fluvial sediments of Lake Humboldt.

Etymology 
The formation was first defined and named by Scheibe in 1933 after the Hacienda Tilatá in Chocontá, near the Sisga Reservoir. Hubach (1957) elevated the Pisos de Tilatá to a formation.

Description

Lithologies 
The Tilatá Formation consists of medium to coarse grained sandstones and conglomerates with minor shale beds.

Stratigraphy and depositional environment 
The Tilatá Formation is the lowermost of the lacustrine and alluvial sequence of the Bogotá savanna. It unconformably overlies the Cretaceous Guadalupe Group and the Paleogene Guaduas, Cacho, Bogotá, and Regadera Formations, and is overlain by the Quaternary Subachoque Formation of Lake Humboldt. Helmens and Van der Hammen (1995) subdivided the formation into three members; Tequendama, Tibagota (Lower Tilatá) and Guasca (Upper Tilatá). The age has been estimated to be Late Miocene to Late Pliocene based on fission track analysis and palynology, with reported ages between 5.3 and 2.7 Ma. The depositional environment has been interpreted as alluvial plains and alluvial fans, formed during the main phase of tectonic uplift of the Eastern Ranges in the Late Pliocene. Dutch geologist Salomon Kroonenberg, who studied the Neogene uplift of the Eastern Andes in Colombia, defines the main stage of uplift between six and four million years ago. Other Dutch geologists Helmens, Van der Hammen and Hooghiemstra have pushed back this uplift phase to between 4.5 and 3 Ma. The upper part of the Tilatá Formation is time-equivalent with the Chorrera Formation, outcropping in Subachoque and the main phase of explosive activity of the Paipa–Iza volcanic complex, active between 4.7 and 3.6 Ma.

Outcrops 

The Tilatá Formation is found at its type locality in the synclinal of the Sisga Reservoir in Chocontá, in the Bogotá River valley, and along the road from Bogotá to Tunja.

See also 

 Geology of the Eastern Hills
 Geology of the Ocetá Páramo
 Geology of the Altiplano Cundiboyacense

References

Bibliography

Maps

External links 
 

Geologic formations of Colombia
Neogene Colombia
Miocene Series of South America
Pliocene Series of South America
Uquian
Chapadmalalan
Montehermosan
Sandstone formations
Conglomerate formations
Alluvial deposits
Formations
Geography of Cundinamarca Department
Geography of Bogotá
Muysccubun